El Catllar is a municipality in the comarca of the Tarragonès in 
Catalonia, Spain.  It is around 9 km north east of Tarragona, and around 70 km west of Barcelona. The municipality has an exclave to the east.

References

 Panareda Clopés, Josep Maria; Rios Calvet, Jaume; Rabella Vives, Josep Maria (1989). Guia de Catalunya, Barcelona: Caixa de Catalunya.   (Catalan).  (Spanish).

External links
 El Catllar – On the route of the castles in Camp de Tarragona region – part I., in Catalonia, Spain (in English)
 Government data pages 

Municipalities in Tarragonès
Populated places in Tarragonès